Tyldesley was a rugby league club in Tyldesley, Lancashire, England. 

The club took part in the meeting at the George Hotel, Huddersfield in 1895 and, after the schism, became founder members of the Northern Rugby Football Union (now Rugby Football League), playing for five seasons from 1895–96 to 1899–1900

History

Early Days 

The first rugby club in Tyldesley was formed in 1881 when, after a meeting of local businessmen and rugby players from other clubs, they decided to move from Garrett Hall to Tyldesley and become Tyldesley Football Club.

In 1891, Tyldesley signed future England International Half-back John "Buff" Berry from Kendal Hornets. He went on to win caps for England (RU) while at Tyldesley in 1891 against Wales, Ireland, and Scotland.

He continued playing for Tyldesley under the Northern Union rules as a stand-off half. Tyldesley beat Widnes to win the 1895 Lancashire (Rugby Union) Cup at Wilderspool Stadium, Warrington, in front of around 15,000 spectators.

Northern Union 

Prior to the Schism, Tyldesley, like many other clubs from Lancashire (and Yorkshire), had suffered punishment by the RFU for "broken time" payments.  And so Tyldesley, represented by a Mr. G Taylor, attended a meeting at The George Hotel, Huddersfield, together with representatives of 21 other clubs, and agreed to form the Northern Rugby Football Union.

After the Great Schism in 1895, Tyldesley were one of the founder members of the new league. In the first season 1895-96 the league consisted of 22 clubs and Tyldesley finished in a very creditable 6th position.

In season 1896-97 the league was divided into Yorkshire and Lancashire, Tyldesley playing in the latter section, where they would stay for the remainder of their (semi) professional existence. They again had a quite successful season finishing in 3rd position out of 14 teams

In the two following seasons, still in the Lancashire section, season 1897-98 & 1898-99 they could only manage a lowly 12th position (out of 14 teams).

In the final season, 1899–1900 they won the wooden spoon, finishing 14th out of 14 teams, with only five points thanks to two wins and one draw.

Revert to Rugby Union 
At the end of the 1901–02 season the club, which had played in the Lancashire second competition, disbanded as the club had amassed substantial liabilities.
A reformed Tyldesley club was admitted to the Rugby Football Union in 1911.

In 1926, landowning Club President (Mr. William Hesketh Ramsden) gave the Well Street ground in trust to the Club.

Club League Record 
The League positions for Tyldesley for the 5 years in which they played (semi) professional Rugby League are given in the following table :-

Heading Abbreviations
RL = Single Division; Pl = Games played; W = Win; D = Draw; L = Lose; PF = Points for; PA = Points against; Diff = Points difference (+ or -); Pts = League points
% Pts = A percentage system was used to determine league positions due to clubs playing varying number of fixtures and against different opponents 
League points: for win = 2; for draw = 1; for loss = 0.

Several fixtures & results 
The following are just a few of Tyldesley's fixtures during the five seasons (and other times) in which they played (semi) professional Rugby League :-

Notes and Comments 
 Folly Fields is the stadium used by Wigan at the time until 1901. They then became sub-tenants of Springfield Park See below - Note 3. 
 Lowerhouse Lane is the original site of the current ground used by Widnes. It was renamed Naughton Park in 1932 in honour of club secretary, Tom Naughton - and later renamed Halton Stadium after being completely rebuilt in 1997.
 Wigan became sub-tenants of Springfield Park, which they shared with Wigan United AFC, playing their first game there on 14 September 1901 at which a crowd of 4,000 saw them beat Morecambe 12–0, and the last game on 28 April 1902 when Wigan beat the Rest of Lancashire Senior Competition. A temporary ground was necessary to span the period between moving from Folly Fields and the new ground at Central Park being constructed.

See also 
 British rugby league system
 Cumberland League
 Rugby league county leagues
 List of defunct rugby league clubs

References

External links 
1896–97 Northern Rugby Football Union season at wigan.rlfans.com
Hull&Proud Fixtures & Results 1896/1897
Widnes Vikings - One team, one passion Season In Review - 1896-97
Saints Heritage Society
Folly Field
Normanton Knights History
Eastmoor Dragons ARLFC - Club Info - History 2

Defunct rugby league teams in England
Sport in the Metropolitan Borough of Wigan
Rugby clubs established in 1881
Founder members of the Northern Rugby Football Union
Rugby league teams in Greater Manchester
Tyldesley
Rugby league teams in Cheshire
1881 establishments in England